The Tale of the Fox was stop-motion animation pioneer Ladislas Starevich's first fully animated feature film. The film is based on the tales of Renard the Fox. Although the animation was finished in Paris after an 18-month period (1929–1930), there were major problems with adding a soundtrack to the film. Finally, funding was given for a German soundtrack by the UFA—Goethe had written a classic version of the Renard legend—and this version had its premiere in Berlin in April 1937.

Released eight months before Walt Disney's Snow White and the Seven Dwarfs, it is the world's sixth-ever animated feature film (and the third surviving animated film, as well as the second to use puppet animation, following The New Gulliver from the USSR). The film was released in France with a French language soundtrack in 1941; this is the version which is currently available on DVD.

Plot
In the kingdom of animals, the fox Renard is used to tricking and fooling everyone. Consequently, the King (a lion) receives more and more complaints. Finally, he orders Renard to be arrested and brought before the throne.

Voice cast
 Claude Dauphin as Monkey.
 Romain Bouquet as Fox.
 Laine as Lion.
 Sylvain Itkine as Wolf.
 Léon Larive as Bear.
 Robert Seller as Cock.
 Eddy Debray as Badger.
 Nicolas Amato as Cat.
 Pons as Donkey.
 Sylvia Bataille as Rabbit.
 Suzy Dornac as Fox Cub.
 Jaime Plama as Cat. (singing voice)

See also
 History of French animation
 List of animated feature-length films
 List of stop-motion films

References
 Moritz, William (1992). "Resistance and Subversion in Animated Films of the Nazi Era: the Case of Hans Fischerkoesen". Animation Journal.

External links
 
 
 

1937 films
1937 drama films
1937 fantasy films
1937 animated films
1937 children's films
1930s French animated films
1930s stop-motion animated films
1930s children's fantasy films
1930s children's animated films
1930s fantasy drama films
1930s French-language films
1930s German-language films
French animated feature films
French children's films
French animated fantasy films
French fantasy drama films
French black-and-white films
Animated drama films
Reynard cycle
Films based on fairy tales
Films about badgers
Animated films about bears
Animated films about cats
Animated films about chickens
Films about donkeys
Animated films about foxes
Animated films about lions
Animated films about monkeys
Animated films about rabbits and hares
Animated films about wolves
Anthropomorphic animals
Films about royalty
Films set in the Middle Ages
Films set in castles
Films set in forests
Films with live action and animation
Films directed by Ladislas Starevich